Charles Assalé (4 November 1911 in South Province – 10 December 1999 in Yaoundé) was a Cameroonian politician of the Union of the Peoples of Cameroon. He served as Minister of Finance of French Cameroon from 1958 to 1959, and was the first Prime Minister of the federated state of East Cameroon from 15 May 1960 to 19 June 1965.

References

1911 births
1999 deaths
People of French Equatorial Africa
Prime Ministers of Cameroon
Finance ministers of Cameroon
Union of the Peoples of Cameroon politicians
People from South Region (Cameroon)